Status attainment is the process of one attaining one's positions in society, or class. Status attainment is affected by both achieved factors, such as educational attainment, and ascribed factors, such as family income. The theory of status attainment states that one can be mobile, either upwardly or downwardly, in the form of a class system.

History
Peter M. Blau (1918–2002) and Otis Duncan (1921–2004) were the first sociologists to isolate the concept of status attainment. Their initial thesis stated that the lower the level from which a person starts, the greater is the probability that he will be upwardly mobile, simply because many more occupational destinations entail upward mobility for men with low origins than for those with high ones. After continued research, the initial statement proved to be incorrect. Blau and Duncan realized that people couldn't possibly think that the best way to get a high-social status position is to start at the bottom. They continued to find that the flaw was in the question the information was based upon. They found their research shouldn't be founded upon the question of "How are people mobile" but on "how do people attain their statuses". Peter Blau and Otis Duncan continued to conduct a landmark research study to provide answers to their new question. .

There are two similar working models in regards to status attainment theory. As Haller & Portes (1973) noted there is the Blau and Duncan's (1967) model which focuses on status transmission, that there is some direct effect of parental influence. However, ultimately the level of education affects occupational attainment. Also, the Wisconsin model comes to similar conclusion however notes that the effects of parental status vanish when other factors are considered. (Haller & Portes, 1973).

In the United States

The occupation of household heads, their level of education, and household income are highly correlated with status attainment and capital. A strong indicator that points to the variation of status attainment is measured through various standardised achievement tests, that reflect academic aptitude. Therefore, the ascribed ability and relation to the constellation of household, strongly affects educational attainment. Academic performance and aptitude carries an influence on status attainment since the highest level of education attained, is a strong predictor of an individual's future occupational positions and the type of work they qualify for.

In a study conducted by Blane et al. (2005) it was found that the higher the IQ in childhood the higher the social class in middle life. Furthermore, it was found that the IQ at age 11 was significantly related to occupational class at middle life.

Encouragement from family and friends will affect education and occupational attainment. These aspirations create an expectation of achieving a certain educational level or occupation. Educational attainment strongly influences occupational attainment. It is clear that all of these factors are linked together and continue to affect each other throughout one's lifespan. 

Status attainment in the U.S. is the process of acquiring positions in educational and occupational hierarchies. Major influential factors include: parental social background, cognitive ability, motivation and education. Very trivial, but nonetheless imperative to one's starting status, family background and upbringing play a major role in status attainment . For example, being born into a wealthy family gives an individual a better starting point than an individual being born into poverty.

Cognitive ability or one's intellect can contribute to the probability of one seeking higher education in life. An individual's level of educational attainment provides a better chance for moving up the occupational ladder. Cognitive ability is linked to motivation and education which are the other two major influential contributors of status attainment. This aspect of status attainment has nothing to do with one's parental social background, but rather acts on its own as an attribute for achieving higher status attainment. Being a factor independent from family background or motivation and education, cognitive ability cannot be enhanced or a predicate of the likelihood of one achieving a higher status. Someone of great intellect could have no motivation to accomplish anything, and someone of lesser intellect could be motivated and do great things.

Perhaps the most influential factor in determining one's status attainment is motivation and education. "This plays an important role in status attainment research and has been found to influence both educational attainment and occupational aspirations of young people, as well as the timing of life course transitions" (Schoon, 72). The higher the motivation a person has the more likely they are to receive higher education and eventually gain a higher paying occupation.

African Americans follow the same path, but their steps are limited. Differences in educational and occupational attainment have declined among African Americans. However, on average, African Americans and Whites begin at different status levels and end in different status levels. Increased schooling benefits everyone, but due to discrimination, white males benefit more.  The same results occur in other minority groups and among females.

As Kerckhoff (1976) notes, African Americans' educational attainments and occupational attainments are lower than those of white people.

Socialization vs. allocation
Socialization and Allocation are two different types of status attainment. Both models discuss the importance of how others effect attainments of an individual. "While both are the same in that aspect both differentiate on theoretical interpretations of the same observations and direct our attention to different kinds of phenomena." (Kerckhoff 368-379).

Allocation 
According to Rodney Stark, allocation theories argue the primary function of schools is to allocate status, to place students in the stratification system, rather than to train them. (Stark 641). "In other words teachers identify and classify students according to externally imposed criteria." (Kerckhoff 368-379). "Since this seems to imply that social order rests upon consensual values, and that the prestige hierarchy is a function of widespread convergence in moral evaluations, the approach has been criticized as an extension of the functional theory of stratification—although its practitioners strenuously deny this charge." (Marshall 1998). In this model "social agencies" try to determine the path of the individual and the individual is constricted to what they can do.  Allocation is "based on "plans" and "exceptions" rather than "wishes" or "aspirations". As children get older they become less convinced that everyone has an equal chance to obtain "good things" in life." (Kerckhoff 368-379). The clearest examples of this model are discrimination of race and individual characteristics. In the article "The Status Attainment Process: Socialization or Allocation?" Alan C. Kerckhoff states "rewards black receive for any level of accomplishment are lower than those of whites at the same level".

Socialization 
Socialization, on the other hand, looks for the characteristics that affect the individual. This term is used by many but most commonly used by psychologist, sociologists and educationalists to describe the learning of ones culture and how to fit in. Also it teaches one how to act and participate in the society. Referring to the book Sociology, Socialization is the process by which culture is learned and internalized by each member of society-much of which occurs during childhood. (Stark 657). Or it can be explained as "the process by which we learn to become members of society, both by internalizing the norms and values of society, and also by learning to perform our social roles." (Marshall 1998). Unlike allocation adults can be enabled to perform new roles. With this model motivation and ability are important factors to help one attain status, this means "Individuals are free to move within the social system, attainments being determined by what the individual does and how well they choose to do it." (Kerckhoff).

Gender

Gender dynamics around the world has changed dramatically over the course of the past few decades and the status attainment for females and women is changing dramatically. Now that more women are joining the workforce, female status attainment is becoming increasingly self-accomplished rather than through family background or gained through marriage. Still in today's society however, women are much less likely than men to hold full-time jobs. This is especially true with women who come from a less privileged background or who have lower education levels. It is also interesting that women with full-time jobs tend to come from more economic prestige than working males. Rodney Stark suggests that "the average working woman's father has more education and a better job than does the father of the average employed male".

Even though women hold fewer jobs than men in some societies, women hold jobs of higher prestige than their male counterparts. This is probably because it is not beneficial for women who are married with children to go out and get lower-paying, lower status jobs because the economic benefits cancel themselves out in the end. Married working women also hold less prestigious jobs than their spouses. This is partially because married people tend to share the same economic backgrounds as well as education levels, and partially because in the process of evolutions, sexual dimorphism has triggered women to prefer wealthy husbands.

In the past, females generally attained their status through family background or marriage. Although it is still true today, females are becoming more independent and socially mobile in many parts of the world. The increased independence and social mobility has led to an increase in women attaining their own status rather than attaining their status through family circumstances and/or through marriage. .

Treiman and Terrel (1975) cautiously note that the mother's educational level strongly affects the education level of the daughter  more so than the educational level of the father.

"Many researchers have found that male and female status attainment processes are virtually identical while others have reported gender differences in the importance of mental ability and family background variables as predictors of attainment".

As a result women face a different type of socialization process than men do. Early childhood experiences are very influential for women. In particular, family, marriage, and early child bearing have great importance for the attainment of women (Wilson & Peterson).

Occupational status

Status attainment is directly related to occupational status. Occupational status and the attainment thereof is perhaps the core idea of status attainment. Status in the workforce is affected by many factors, most notably, gender, parent status, and work trends. 

Education is the most important determinant for men and women when it comes to occupational status (McClendon, 1976).

In the 1973 survey conducted in Canada, Porter began to explore ideas of occupational status attainment. John Porter started his study believing that Canadians were less mobile than Americans in terms of climbing the occupational status ladder. In fact it was quite the opposite, Canadians as well as Americans had higher occupational statuses if their parents were high on the status ladder. This study also showed that gender can be important as well. Women who have full-time jobs come from families higher up on the occupational ladder than men do. Work trends as well are a major factor in determining the occupational status of a person. We have seen a large shift of the workforce move from the agriculture aspect to largely skilled jobs. Since, few are left to labor in the agricultural field, we’ve found that those left are not unskilled laborers but rather farm owners. Thus a large shift in the occupational status of an average person in the agricultural sector has occurred.(citing required/ date= Oct 2014)

Current research
 A research study of the country of Vietnam was conducted by the University of Utah in 2003. The study was focused upon the status attainment processes experienced by a generation of young men and women entering school and work roles during the transition of socialism to market economy in the Socialist Republic of Vietnam (Korinek). The analysis of the research seemed to show similar results to earlier implications on how status is attained through quality education rather than job, or social status of their parents.
 Blau and Duncan model: studies by Peter M. Blau and Otis Dudley Duncan in 1962, tested the correlation between son's occupational status with father's occupational status. Their studies were limited to males and showed two aspects of a person's social class of origin: father's educational achievements and occupational prestige; both ascriptive status traits (fixed at birth). The purpose of the study was to test whether ascriptive or achieved characteristics directly affected status attainment of the child. Higher father's educational achievements could yield higher child's educational achievement due to higher expectations and more support for attainment. Higher father's occupational prestige could increase educational expectations for the child as well as providing financial resources to support higher education. This model set the foundation for further investigation.
 Blau and Duncan both analyzed status attainment within a wide framework by using a basic mobility model. They thought that it would be easiest to analyze if they examined the process by which men move up and down the social ladder in their family of origin to adult positions in a hierarchy of occupations. "Rather than depicting the father-son relationship in a cross-tabular form, the regression method made it possible to approximate the process by which the son's status was attained" Schoon, Ingrid (2008), A Transgenerational Model of Status Attainment: the Potential Mediating Role of School Motivation and Education, National Institute Economic Review, pp. 72–81. This model was coined the Wisconsin model. It focused on the processes of individuals developing personal qualities, such as motivation or skills at a given task that lead to educational achievement and eventually to positions on the occupational ladder. Acknowledgments between education, family status, and young people's ability levels as well as their motivations and aspirations were all contributive to one's status attainment.
 Wisconsin model: developed by William H. Sewell and his associates, further studied the mold set forth by Blau and Duncan. Their addition of variables such as: a child's mental ability, educational achievement, peer influence and personal aspirations, helped link stratification and mental ability inputs through a set of social psychological and behavioral mechanisms to educational and occupational attainment. These subjective variables added a social psychological side that Blau and Duncan lacked in their research. The study did not make any definite solutions of child status attainment but contributed greatly to encourage even further research.
 Other studies have spurred the debate over what constitutes status attainment? In the UK for example, controversies arise over whether or not one's own merit (ability and effort) should have precedence over one's own background and class distinctions. Saunders found "that class background only has a small influence on occupational attainment, while individual ability and motivation play by far a greater role".
 On the other hand, opposing evidence formulated opinions that "there is still a substantial effect of social class of origin on own adult social status after controlling for general cognitive ability and academic motivation". Moreover, there is also evidence that differences in education and higher qualifications reached clearly indicates more importance than ability and motivation when it comes to class effects of origin on adult outcomes.

Notes

References
 
 Duncan, O. D., Featherman, D. L., & Duncan, B. (1972). Socioeconomic background and achievement. New York: Seminar Press.
 
 
 
 Hanneman, Robert A. Status Attainment. Retrieved December 13, 2007, from University of California, Riverside, Department of Sociology Web site
 
 
 
 Marshall, Gordon (1998). Socialization. Retrieved October 22, 2007, from Encyclopedia.com Web site
 Marshall, Gordon (1998). Status attainment. Retrieved October 22, 2007, from encyclopedia.com Web site
 
 
 
 

Sociological theories